"If I Only Had a Brain" (also "If I Only Had a Heart" and "If I Only Had the Nerve") is a song by Harold Arlen (music) and Yip Harburg (lyrics).  The song is sung in the 1939 film The Wizard of Oz by the character Scarecrow, played by Ray Bolger, when he meets Dorothy, played by Judy Garland.  The characters pine about what each wants from the Wizard. It was also sung in Jeremy Sams and Andrew Lloyd Webber's 2011 musical adaptation with an additional reprise called "If We Only Had a Plan" when the characters discuss on how to rescue Dorothy in Act II.

Originally written by Arlen and Harburg as "I'm Hanging On To You" for the 1937 Broadway musical Hooray for What!, the song was ultimately dropped from that show, and when the pair was later hired to do the songs for Oz, Harburg simply wrote new lyrics to his catchy melody, a syncopated schottische in the style of tunes used for vaudeville soft shoe and sand dancing.

"If I Only Had a Brain" 
The Scarecrow's version of the song is sung about getting a brain. The original recording included an extravagant Busby Berkeley-choreographed dance routine, but this was eventually cut for length reasons. A closing vocal stanza was likewise cut. Both pieces still exist and are available for viewing.

In the film as officially released, he sings the first and second verses of this song, then falls over comically. In the original cut as well as the 1985 film That's Dancing!, though, he sings the first and second verses, begins to dance, and eventually a crow takes a large portion of his straw. The scarecrow then flies in the air to get it back, which he does. Then, he does some splits (forward and backward), and then a pumpkin rolls down the road. When it goes through the scarecrow's legs, he is thrown high into the air. Now, he comes down, bounces against the fences, sings a third verse of this song, then falls down.

That sequence was eventually used as a segment in the 1985 film That's Dancing!, and Warner Bros. considered restoring it for Oz'''s 1998 theatrical re-release, but decided against it. The sequence is included as a DVD extra on the 1999, 2005, and 2009 releases.

Ray Bolger's original recording of the song was far more sedate compared to the version heard in the film; it was decided by the producers that a more energetic rendition would better suit Dorothy's initial meeting with the Scarecrow, and was re-recorded as such. Thought to be lost for over seven decades, a recording of this original version was discovered in 2009.

Harry Connick, Jr. recorded "If I Only Had a Brain" for his 1988 album 20.  This song was also covered by alternative rock band The Flaming Lips for the soundtrack to the video game Stubbs the Zombie. Dave Matthews Band often interpolates this into the song Bartender, near the end.

Rick DePiro, organist in the 1980s for the Cleveland Indians, used "If I Only Had a Brain" often to poke fun at umpires when they were thought to make a bad call. In 2007, New Orleans songwriter Paul Sanchez recorded the song for the children's album, Funky Kidz. The song is also featured in an ad for GE that first aired during Super Bowl XLIII.

Jackson Browne sang a folk music tempo in the 1995 television special The Wizard of Oz in Concert: Dreams Come True when he performed as the Scarecrow. His rendition opens with verses about having Common sense which were not sung by Ray Bolger in the original film. It also included the deleted final verses. This song features Ry Cooder's guitar and David Sanborn's saxophone in the instrumental background.
In the 1998 album Wholly Earth the jazz singer and activist Abbey Lincoln also sang it; the lyrics tell of a scarecrow lamenting to a blackbird about wanting common sense.

Additionally, The Four Freshmen have recorded a version of the song, with Brian Eichenberger, who wrote the arrangement, soloing in the spirit of the Scarecrow. Jeremy Little also recorded an acoustic version of the song, which was featured on the Fox television series Fringe, at the end of the episode "The Firefly."

The song is also included as a kind of Easter Egg on iOS devices with Siri. When asking Siri to "sing me a song", Siri will occasionally sing the first few lines of this song.

The University of Phoenix used a version of the song with different lyrics in a commercial in 2016.

 "If I Only Had a Heart" 
The Tin Man's version of the song, about getting a heart, is sung after he says "No heart. All hollow." In the song, a girl's voice (that of Adriana Caselotti, best known for playing the title role in Disney's Snow White and the Seven Dwarfs'') comes in singing, "Wherefore art thou Romeo?"

The song was first recorded by Buddy Ebsen, originally cast as the Tin Man until a makeup-induced illness forced him to withdraw. Although it was re-recorded by his replacement, Jack Haley, Ebsen's original recording survived and can be heard as one of many bonus tracks on the 1995 deluxe soundtrack release, as well as various home video/DVD releases from 1989-onward. Ebsen's version also contains the separately recorded single line recited by Adriana Caselotti.

Ebsen performed his vocals in his natural voice. In his Tin Man portion of the film, Haley eschewed his own natural, somewhat deeper and stronger voice, and both spoke and sang in a softened tone that he said was the tone he typically used when reading stories to his children.

Roger Daltrey sang a rock and roll tempo in the 1995 television special when he performed as the Tin Man while Jewel who performed as Dorothy sang the verse "Wherefore art thou Romeo?" in order for it to have a girl's voice in the background.

"If I Only Had the Nerve" 
The Cowardly Lion's version, about courage, is the shortest of the three, and is connected to "We're Off to See the Wizard" by a bridge saying "Then I'm sure to get a brain; a heart; a home; the nerve" (a longer version was written, but it was shortened in the interest of balance, since Bert Lahr was given a second musical number, "If I Were King of the Forest," later in the film).

Lahr's characteristic regional accent was exploited and emphasized for comic effect in this song, with several words pronounced in a stereotypically "Brooklynese" way: "voive" for "verve", "desoive" for "deserve", and "noive" for "nerve".

The first line was initially recorded as "Yeah, it's sad to be admittin'/When you're vicious as a kitten," but it was eventually changed to "Yeah, it's sad, believe it, missy/When you're born to be a sissy."

The longer version of this song was used in the 1995 television stage performance. It was sung by Nathan Lane in a Broadway tempo. This version includes the bridge verses sung by The Scarecrow (Jackson Browne), Tin Man (Roger Daltrey) and Dorothy (Jewel).

See also 
 Musical selections in The Wizard of Oz

References 

Songs from The Wizard of Oz (1939 film)
Songs with lyrics by Yip Harburg
Songs with music by Harold Arlen
Songs written for films
1939 songs